The Mayoral election of 1945 in Pittsburgh, Pennsylvania was held on Tuesday, November 6, 1945. Incumbent Democratic Party Conn Scully chose not to seek reelection. State Democratic Party chairman and longtime Pittsburgh political player David Lawrence was elected to succeed him in what is the city's most recent competitive race. Bob Waddell, the popular football coach of Carnegie Tech (now Carnegie Mellon University) ran for a second time using his colorful personality and sports fame. However, the powerful Lawrence was able to rally a large base en route to a close win.

Results

References

1945 Pennsylvania elections
1945 United States mayoral elections
1945
1940s in Pittsburgh
November 1945 events in the United States